Thomas Maduit Nelson (September 27, 1782 – November 10, 1853) was a 19th-century politician from Virginia, United States.

Biography
Born in Oak Hill, Mecklenburg County, Virginia, Nelson attended the common schools as a child. During the War of 1812, he was commissioned a captain to the 10th Infantry Regiment and was later promoted to major in the 13th and 18th Infantry Regiments. After the war, he was reduced back to a captain and eventually resigned from his commission on May 15, 1815. Nelson was elected a Democratic-Republican to the United States House of Representatives to fill a vacancy in 1816, serving until 1819.

He died near Columbus, Georgia at age 71 and was interred there in Linwood Cemetery.

External links

1782 births
1853 deaths
United States Army personnel of the War of 1812
Democratic-Republican Party members of the United States House of Representatives from Virginia
19th-century American politicians
People from Mecklenburg County, Virginia
Burials in Georgia (U.S. state)
United States Army officers